Duluth Denfeld High School, also known as Denfeld High School, is one of two high schools in Duluth, Minnesota along with Duluth East as of 2011 after the closure of Duluth Central and the previous closing of Morgan Park HS in 1982. Serving over 1000 students from grades nine to twelve, Denfeld High School has become a West Duluth landmark.  The school is known for its architecture, including a historic auditorium and a 120-foot clock tower visible from Grand Avenue.

History

The home of the Hunters, Denfeld High School was known as Irving High School when it opened for classes on 11 September 1905. It was later called Duluth Industrial High School. When the school moved into today's MacArthur West school building at 725 North Central Avenue in 1915, its name was changed to honor Robert E. Denfeld, superintendent of Duluth schools from 1885 to 1916. During his tenure, the number of schools in Duluth increased from seven to 34. Denfeld was instrumental in the creation of a two-year program to train teachers which eventually grew to become the University of Minnesota Duluth.

The current building was constructed in red brick and limestone at a cost of $1,250,000 and opened in September 1926. Duluth architects Abraham Holstead and W.J. Sullivan designed the H-shaped English Gothic style building which features medieval carvings by Duluth master stone carver George Thrana. Thrana came to Duluth in 1889 from Norway where he was trained as a stone sculptor. He carved for 40 years in sandstone, granite, marble and limestone and his work is featured on many Duluth buildings including the Lyceum Theater, Old Central High School, Glensheen, the Board of Trade Building, St. Louis County Courthouse and the St. Louis County Jail.

Perhaps the most iconic feature of the Denfeld High School building is its 120-foot clock tower. The tower features eight buttresses. Its face was designed by Carl Shroer, a teacher at Central High School, and was completed by Denfeld students who welded together four sections cast in aluminum by the Duluth Brassworks Company. The numbers on the face were painted silver and the clock hands were gold painted wood. The face was later painted black, in order to make it more easily visible from Grand Avenue.

Denfeld High School's auditorium was built at a cost of $25,000 and is another of its most prominent features. It can accommodate nearly 2000 people in the audience, 200 on stage and includes an orchestra pit. Public figures who've visited in the auditorium include Richard Nixon and Johnny Cash. The auditorium was renovated for $1,200,000 and reopened in late 2006 after being closed for nearly a year. The auditorium is the annual venue for Denfeld's traditional Maroon and Gold Day assembly during the week of homecoming when the auditorium is adorned with maroon and gold decorations and the students are entertained with cheers, skits, music and school spirit. Alumni return to Denfeld for this display, intended to build community among students -- as well as motivating the football team and fans for the annual Homecoming game at the end of the week.

Homecoming Week

Homecoming Week activities include daily dress-up days such as "Kid Day" (usually on Tuesday) and "Maroon and Gold Day" (every Friday for the last 100 years.) On Wednesday of Homecoming Week, a massive bonfire takes place in Merritt Park in West Duluth during which the game of Red Rover is usually played between the upper and lowerclassmen and every cheer in the cheerleaders' book is started. The biggest event during the week besides the football game and assembly is the hall decorating contest, where the interior first floor of the building is covered in handmade posters, streamers, locker signs, balloons and other decorations. Freshmen decorate the hall near the cafeteria and sophomores decorate the other half of the hall, while juniors decorate the second floor. Until the fall of 2006, seniors traditionally decorated the auditorium, however after a renovation of the room in the 2006–2007 school year, seniors have since decorated the third floor hallway to ensure the auditorium's features remain preserved.

Maroon and Gold Day

Denfeld's Maroon and Gold Day is Friday of homecoming week. Students wear maroon and/or gold clothing and accessories. During the assembly, the band marches from the back of the auditorium through streamers and balloons to the orchestra pit playing the cadence and school song. Everyone stands throughout the entire assembly. After the school song is played, the National Anthem is sung followed by several skits, speeches by alumni and the Maroon and Gold Day Pageant. In this pageant, anybody can enter for a chance to become Maroon & Gold King or Queen. Each contestant is allowed to flaunt their costume and spirit to the audience. Winners are chosen by three judges, all Denfeld staff, based on audience reaction. After the pageant are more skits and the winner of the hall decorating contest is announced. The football team starting lineup is announced and the school song is played again at the end of the assembly.

The homecoming game
The Denfeld Marching Band and the Dance Team always perform during the halftime show.

The Milken Educator Award

On October 11, 2007 Denfeld social studies teacher Thomas Tusken was presented with the Milken Educator Awards, established by Milken Family Foundation Chairman Lowell Milken to provide public recognition and individual financial rewards of $25,000 to elementary and secondary teachers, principals and specialists who are furthering excellence in education. Only 35 educators in Minnesota had received the award at that time and Tusken was just the second recipient from Duluth. The award was presented to Tusken during an unexpected assembly, the purpose of which was unknown to students and staff. When Tusken's name was called, he received a standing ovation from the audience.

Future of the school

In the spring of 2007, restructuring of Duluth's elementary, middle and high schools was discussed. Three options were proposed:
  
 The Red Plan: Central and East would no longer function as high schools, leaving Denfeld as the only original high school in Duluth. Ordean Middle School would be turned into a high school with both buildings being remodeled and expanded to accommodate 1500 students.
 The White Plan: Denfeld and East would become middle schools capable of holding 1100 students. Central would not be used, as Ordean and a new western high school would be created to accommodate 3000 total students.
 The Blue Plan: East and Denfeld would be transformed into middle schools. Central would be used as the lone high school after being expanded to accommodate 3000 students.

The Duluth School District ultimately chose a modified version of the Red Plan, leaving Denfeld open and adding approximately half of the Central population. To accommodate the increased student population, two new additions to the school were built. Additionally, the school underwent major reconstruction in order to conform to state standards. Construction began in 2009 and continued until 2011.  To accommodate the new addition, Denfeld's signature brick chimney had to be removed.  The chimney was an original feature of the building, but had not been used in many years.  Construction crews cafefully removed the bricks, and the school planned to preserve some bricks for historical purposes.  As a result of the construction, Denfeld and Central students both attended Central during the 2010–11 school year. In 2011, Central closed, leaving Denfeld and East as the only public high schools in Duluth.

Principals
Tom Tusken (2020 to present)
Tonya M. Sconiers (2012 to 2019)
Ed Crawford (2005 to 2012)
William Westholm (1995 to 2005)
George F. Holliday, Jr. (1991 to 1995)
Dr. Stephen Seyfer (1984 to 1991)
Dr. Wayne Samskar (1970 to 1984)
Robert Van Kleek (1963 to 1970)
G. Dell Daedo (1948 to 1963)
Dr. Chester Wood (1945 to 1948)
James Taylor (1918 to 1945)
T. H. Shutte (1916 to 1918)
Scott Foster (1905 to 1916)

Athletic achievements

The "Hunters" name originates from Walt Hunting who taught, coached and was the athletic director at Denfeld from 1927 to 1956. A tribute to Hunting from his players, fans and the community at the silver anniversary of his coaching career in 1952 said, "It isn't the championships won that make Walt Hunting great. The boys who have played for him learned more than a game. They learned honesty, integrity and sportsmanship. Nobody could possibly be associated with Walt Hunting and not be better for it because he symbolizes everything great about America."

 1917 Football unofficial state champions
 1922 Football state runner-up
 1924 Football district champions
 1926 Football Head of the Lakes champions
 1927 Football unofficial state champions
 1933 Football city champions
 1935 Football unofficial state champions
 1941 Football city champions
 1942 Football unofficial state champions
 1945 Football city champions
 1946 Football city champions
 1947 Basketball state champions
 1947 Ski jumping state champions
 1948 Football state champions
 1950 Baseball state champions
 1951 Ski jumping state champions
 1953 Ski jumping state champions
 1954 Baseball goes to State
 1964 Football city champions
 1974 Football "Super Bowl" champions
 1986 Hockey state 3rd place
 1988 Hockey state 4th place
 1989 Hockey state 3rd place
 1990 Girls Softball state 4th place
 1990 Soccer's inaugural season, unofficial "Area" Champs as local teams were only HS Club level until '91
 1992 Girls Basketball state 4th place
 1994 Boys Soccer Lake Superior Conference Champions, North Sub-Section 4 champions, Section 4 runners-up
 1996 Football Sea Range Conference champions
 2000 Girls Soccer Section 7A champions
 2002 Boys Soccer Lake Superior Conference champions
 2003 Boys Soccer Lake Superior Conference champions
 2004 Boys Soccer Section 7A champions, State participants.
 2004 Football North Country Conference co-champions
 2005 Football North Country Conference runners-up
 2006 Two-time state third-place finisher in swimming (50 free and 100 butterfly)
 2007 Football North Country Conference runners-up
 2010 Football North Country Conference champions
 2012 One Act Play Sections runners-up
 2012 Boys Soccer Section 7A second place
 2012/13 Boys Hockey Section second place
 2013 Boys Nordic Skiing conference champions
 2013 Girls Soccer Section 7A champions, State participants
 2016 The FIRST Robotics Competition team 4009 from Denfeld won the Lake Superior Regional to qualify for the FIRST Championship. 
 2016 Nathaniel Rosholt (class of 2016) goes to State in Nordic Skiing
 2016 Boys Soccer Section 7A champions, State participants
 2017 Benjamin Emmel (class of 2018) goes to state in Boys' Golf
 2017 Quinten Rimolde (sophomore) and Nick Anderson (senior) qualified for the State Debate Tournament
 2018 Boys Soccer Lake Superior Conference Champions, Section 7A Champions, State Participants
 2019 Baseball, Section Champs, Goes to State
 2019 Track, Blake Eaton (Class of '22) sets State Record in 200 meter dash, wheelchair division at 35.70 seconds.
 2020 Boys Soccer, Section 7A Champions. No State games due to COVID-19 restrictions. Keegan Chastey (Class of '21) named a Minnesota Mr. Soccer Finalist
 2021 Track. Blake Eaton (Class of '22), wins 2 State Titles: 100 and 200 meter wheelchair dashes.
 2021 Golf.  Nate Burke (Class of '21) qualifies for State.
 2021 Boys Soccer, Section 7AA runners-up. Joe Eklund (class of '22) named a Minnesota Mr. Soccer Finalist
 2022 Boys Soccer, Section 7AA runners-up. Parker Chastey (class of '23) named a Minnesota Mr. Soccer Finalist

Notable alumni
Greg Anderson, NHRA driver, class of 1979
Dorothy Arnold (Olson), actress and first wife of Joe DiMaggio, class of 1935
Mike Colalillo, Congressional Medal of Honor recipient (left school at age 16)
Roger Grimsby, television news anchor, class of 1946
C. J. Ham, football player
Lenny Lane, professional wrestler, class of 1989
Russ Method, football player
Richard F. Palmer, newspaper editor and Minnesota state senator
Barbara Rotvig, baseball player
Robb Stauber, ice hockey goaltender, class of 1986
Pete Stauber, Politician, MN 8th District, US House of Representatives

References

External links

Duluth Denfeld High School website – Duluth Public Schools
Denfeld Alumni Association website
Denfeld Teacher Receives Award
Milken Educator Awards

Educational institutions established in 1905
High schools in Duluth, Minnesota
Public high schools in Minnesota
1905 establishments in Minnesota